N'Zoo or Nzo is a town and sub-prefecture in the Lola Prefecture in the Nzérékoré Region of south-eastern Guinea.

It is situated at a few kilometers from the Mount Nimba Strict Nature Reserve.

History
Before the arrival of the French, N'Zoo was a satellite village for Doromou.  It started to gain importance when Princess Pokou of Doromou started a big market there.
Later, in the early 20th century, the French also used N'Zoo as a base for trading in the region. Today N'Zoo is a small town, with basic services: a health center, a primary and a secondary school, a customs office and a police station.

References

Sub-prefectures of the Nzérékoré Region